Cars is a surname. Notable people with the surname include:

 Hadar Cars (born 1933), Swedish politician
 Jean-François Cars (1670–1739), French engraver
 Laurent Cars (1699–1771), French designer and engraver